A machine-readable passport (MRP) is a machine-readable travel document (MRTD) with the data on the identity page encoded in optical character recognition format. Many countries began to issue machine-readable travel documents in the 1980s.

Most travel passports worldwide are MRPs. They are standardized by the ICAO Document 9303 (endorsed by the International Organization for Standardization and the International Electrotechnical Commission as ISO/IEC 7501-1) and have a special machine-readable zone (MRZ), which is usually at the bottom of the identity page at the beginning of a passport. The ICAO 9303 describes three types of documents corresponding to the ISO/IEC 7810 sizes:
 "Type 3" is typical of passport booklets. The MRZ consists of 2 lines × 44 characters. 
 "Type 2" is relatively rare with 2 lines × 36 characters.
 "Type 1" is of a credit card-size with 3 lines × 30 characters.
The fixed format allows specification of document type, name, document number, nationality, date of birth, sex, and document expiration date. All these fields are required on a passport. There is room for optional, often country-dependent, supplementary information. There are also two sizes of machine-readable visas similarly defined. 

Computers with a camera and suitable software can directly read the information on machine-readable passports. This enables faster processing of arriving passengers by immigration officials, and greater accuracy than manually-read passports, as well as faster data entry, more data to be read and better data matching against immigration databases and watchlists.

Apart from optically readable information, many passports contain an RFID chip which enables computers to read a higher amount of information, for example a photo of the bearer. These passports are called biometric passports and are also described by ICAO 9303.

Format

Passport booklets

Passport booklets have an identity page containing the identity data. This page is in the TD3 size of 125 × 88 mm (4.92 × 3.46 in).

The data of the machine-readable zone consists of two rows of 44 characters each. The only characters used are A–Z, 0–9 and the filler character <.

In the name field, spaces, hyphens and other punctuation are represented by <, except apostrophes, which are skipped. If the names are too long, names are abbreviated to their most significant parts. In that case, the last position must contain an alphabetic character to indicate possible truncation, and if there is a given name, the two fillers and at least one character of it must be included.

Official travel documents 

Smaller documents such as identity and passport cards are usually in the TD1 size, which is 85.6 × 54.0 mm (3.37 × 2.13 in), the same size as credit cards. The data of the machine-readable zone in a TD1 size card consists of three rows of 30 characters each. The only characters used are A–Z, 0–9 and the filler character <.

Some official travel documents are in the larger TD2 size, 105.0 × 74.0 (4.13 × 2.91 in). They have a layout of the MRZ with two rows of 36 characters each, similar to the TD3 format, but with 31 characters for the name, 7 for the personal number and one less check digit. Yet some official travel documents are in the booklet format with a TD3 identity page.

The format of the first row for TD1 (credit card size) documents is:

The format of the second row is:

1: United States Passport Cards, as of 2011, use this field for the application number that produced the card.

The format of the third row is:

The format of the first row for TD2 (medium size) documents is:

The format of the second row is:

Machine-readable visas 

The ICAO Document 9303 part 7 describes machine-readable visas. They come in two different formats:
MRV-A - 80 mm × 120 mm (3.15 in × 4.72 in), 2 × 44 chars
MRV-B - 74 mm × 105 mm (2.91 in × 4.13 in), 2 × 36 chars

The format of the first row of the machine-readable zone is:

The format of the second row is:

Specifications common to all formats 
The ICAO document 9303 part 3 describes specifications common to all Machine Readable Travel Documents.

This is in order to allow use of a single machine reader.

Only characters A to Z (upper case), 0–9, and < (angle bracket) are allowed. The typeface is OCR-B.

Nationality codes
The nationality codes shall contain the ISO 3166-1 alpha-3 code with modifications for all formats. The check digit calculation method is also the same for all formats.

Some values that are different from ISO 3166-1 alpha-3 are used for the issuing country and nationality field:
 BAH: Bahamas (erroneously used in some early Bahamian passports; corrected to BHS)
 D: Germany
 EUE: European Union
 GBD: British Overseas Territories Citizen (BOTC) (note: the country code of the overseas territory is used to indicate issuing authority and nationality of BOTC), formerly British Dependent Territories Citizen (BDTC)
 GBN: British National (Overseas)
 GBO: British Overseas Citizen
 GBP: British Protected Person
 GBS: British Subject
 UNA: specialized agency of the United Nations
 UNK: Resident of Kosovo to whom a travel document has been issued by the United Nations Interim Administration Mission in Kosovo (UNMIK)
 UNO: United Nations organization
 XBA: African Development Bank
 XIM: African Export–Import Bank
 XCC: Caribbean Community or one of its emissaries
 XCO: Common Market for Eastern and Southern Africa
 XEC: Economic Community of West African States
 XPO: International Criminal Police Organization
 XOM: Sovereign Military Order of Malta
 XXA: Stateless person, as per the 1954 Convention Relating to the Status of Stateless Persons 
 XXB: Refugee, as per the 1951 Convention Relating to the Status of Refugees
 XXC: Refugee, other than defined above
 XXX: Unspecified nationality
 ZIM: Zimbabwe (erroneously used in some early Zimbabwean passports; corrected to ZWE)

Other values, which do not have broad acceptance internationally, include:
 NSK: Neue Slowenische Kunst passport (basically not accepted at all as passport)
 RKS: Kosovo
 WSA: World Service Authority World Passport (basically not accepted at all as passport)
 XCT: Turkish Republic of Northern Cyprus

Checksum calculation
The check digit calculation is as follows: each position is assigned a value; for the digits 0 to 9 this is the value of the digits, for the letters A to Z this is 10 to 35, for the filler < this is 0. The value of each position is then multiplied by its weight; the weight of the first position is 7, of the second it is 3, and of the third it is 1, and after that the weights repeat 7, 3, 1, and so on. All values are added together and the remainder of the final value divided by 10 is the check digit.

Names
Due to technical limits, characters inside the Machine Readable Zone (MRZ) need to be restricted to the 10 Arabic numerals, the 26 capital Latin letters A through Z, and the filler character <.

Apostrophes and similar punctuation marks have to be omitted, but hyphens and spaces should be replaced by an opening angle bracket. Diacritical marks are not permitted in the MRZ. Even though they may be useful to distinguish names, the use of diacritical marks in the MRZ could confuse machine-reading equipment.

Section 6 of the 9303 part 3 document specifies transliteration of letters outside the A–Z range. It recommends that diacritical marks on Latin letters A-Z are simply omitted (ç → C, ð → D, ê → E, ñ → N etc.), but it allows the following transliterations:
 å → AA
 ä → AE
 ð → DH
 ij (Dutch letter; capital form: IJ, the J as part of the ligature being capitalized, too)→ IJ
 ö → OE
 ü → UE (German) or UXX (Spanish; not used in reality)
 ñ → NXX (not used in reality)

The following transliterations are mandatory:
 æ → AE
 ø, œ → OE
 ß → SS
 þ → TH

In Germany, Austria, Switzerland, Hungary and Scandinavia it is standard to use the Å→AA, Ä or Æ→AE, Ö or Ø→OE, Ü→UE, and ß→SS mappings, so Müller'' becomes MUELLER, Gößmann becomes GOESSMANN, and Hämäläinen becomes HAEMAELAEINEN. ð, ñ and ü occur in Iceland and Spain, but they write them as D, N and U.

Austrian passports may (but do not always) contain a trilingual (in German, English, and French) explanation of the German umlauts and ß, e.g. 'ß' entspricht / is equal to / correspond à 'SS'.

There are also tables for the transliteration of names written using Cyrillic and Arabic scripts, mainly based on transliteration rules into English. For example, the Russian surname Горбачёв ("Gorbatschow" in German, "Gorbatchov" in French, "Gorbachov" in Spanish, "Gorbaczow" in Polish) is transcribed "Gorbachev" in both English and according to the ICAO 9303 rules.

Russian visas (and Russian internal passports since 2011) have a different transliteration into the machine-readable zone. As an example, the letter "ч" is usually transcribed as "ch" in Russian travel documents, however, Russian visas and internal passports use "3" in the machine-readable zone instead. Another example is "Alexei" (travel passport) → "Алексей" (Cyrillic version) → "ALEKSEQ" (machine readable version in an internal document). This makes it easier to transliterate the name back to Cyrillic.

First and given names
For airline tickets, visas and more, the advice is to only use the first name written in the passport. This is a problem for people who use their second name (as defined by the order in the passport) as their main name in daily speech. It is common, for example in Scandinavia, that the second or even third name is the one defined for daily usage: for example, the actor Hugh Laurie, whose full name is James Hugh Calum Laurie. Swedish travel agents usually book people using the first and daily name if the first one is not their main name, despite advice to use only the first name. If this is too long, the spelling in the MRZ could be used.

For people using a variant of their first name in daily speech, for example the former US president Bill Clinton whose full name is William Jefferson Clinton, the advice is to spell their name as in the passport.

In Scandinavian legislation, middle name is a name placed between given and surname, and is usually a family name. Such names are written as extra surname in the passports. People have been stranded at airports since they entered this extra family name in the "middle name" field in airline booking form, which in English speaking tradition is a given name.

Chinese, Japanese, Korean and Hungarian names might pose a challenge too, since the family name is normally written first. Tickets should use given name and surname as indicated in passports.

This name issue is also an issue for post-Brexit EU women under the Brexit settled status (they have two family names, a birth and marriage name, but only the birth name was used by the passport MRZ and therefore used in the settlement application, although they have been using the married name in UK population register).

See also
Basic Access Control
Biometric passport
Card standards
ISO/IEC 14443 (Proximity card standard)
List of national identity card policies by country
Identity document 
Identity Cards Act 2006 of the United Kingdom
Universal Electronic Card

References

External links
A description of the Machine Readable Passport Zone
MRTD - Machine Readable Travel Document - Home (ICAO)
ICAO Standards for e-Passports: Machine Readable Travel Documents

Passports